Mario J. Civera, Jr. (born June 19, 1946) is an American politician from Pennsylvania. A Republican, he served as a member of the Pennsylvania House of Representatives for the 164th District (1980-2010) and Delaware County Council (2010-2017).

Career
Prior to his election to the House, Civera served on the Upper Darby Board of Commissioners.  While serving on the Upper Darby Township Council, he was also chairman of the Public Safety Committee.

On March 11, 1980, Civera won election to the House in a special election to replace Frank Lynch, who had resigned in January 1980.  He has won re-election to each succeeding session of the House.

Civera did not run for reelection in 2010.

Dual office controversy
In November 2009, Civera was elected to the Delaware County Council and was sworn into office on January 4, 2010. However, controversy arose when Civera would not resign from his state House seat and thus is holding both offices. During his county council campaign, Civera said he would step down from the House, but after the election said he had no plans to leave, saying he wanted to stay in Harrisburg to complete work on a table games bill needed to finalize the 2009 budget and tie up some other loose ends. He also pointed out that he had never given a definitive date for his resignation. Democrats would like Civera to resign by March so a special election could take place in the May primary at the same time a competitive primary race for a state Senate seat is expected to drive up Democratic voter turnout, hence Civera's assertion that Democrats "want to steal the election."

Personal
Civera lives with his wife in Delaware County.  He has one son, three stepsons, and seven grandchildren.

References

External links

Biography, voting record, and interest group ratings at Project Vote Smart

1946 births
Living people
Politicians from Philadelphia
Republican Party members of the Pennsylvania House of Representatives
United States Air Force non-commissioned officers
Delaware County Councilmembers (Pennsylvania)